The Milton J. Rubenstein Museum of Science and Technology (often referred to as the MOST) is a science and technology museum located in the Armory Square neighborhood of Downtown Syracuse, New York. The Museum includes 35,000 square feet of permanent and traveling exhibits, Science Shop, and several programs and events. The MOST is located in the former Syracuse Armory.

Permanent exhibits include: Innovation Station, Dino Zone!, Earth Science Discovery Cave, Upstate Medical University Life Sciences, Lockheed Martin Flight & Space, Science Playhouse, Technotown, National Grid Energy: Powering Our Future, Climbing Wall and Ham Radio Station.

The MOST will be opening a brand new domed theatre, planetarium, and media lab in April 2022, formerly known as the Bristol IMAX Omnitheatre.

History
In 1977 the Junior League, National Council of Jewish Women and the Technology club started to plan the opening of this institution. In 1979, the goals were set to develop a center where scientific and technological information would be presented to involve the general public, students and the technical community around Syracuse, to use participatory exhibits and educational programs extensively, and to encourage creativity and involvement. The original museum, then known as the Discovery Center, opened on November 15, 1981, in a storefront at 321 South Clinton Street in downtown Syracuse.
	
By the late 1980s, museum officials began to consider a new location for the Museum, which had become an important community asset visited by more than 800,000 people. At the same time, local officials were considering what to do with the old Armory in downtown Syracuse. In 1992, New York State and the federal government accepted The Discovery Center's proposal to open a Museum of Science & Technology in the Armory building. On October 27, 1992, the MOST, hosting hands-on exhibits and the Silverman Planetarium, opened to the public. In January 1997, the 214-seat Bristol IMAX Omnitheater – the only domed IMAX theater in New York State – opened. In 2021,the Museum announced the closure of the IMAX Omnitheater as well as the planetarium as part of a major project to upgrade the theater to digital.

KC2APG was the Federal Communications Commission (FCC) club call sign issued for the amateur radio station at the MoST. On March 11, 2014, the amateur radio station received the FCC vanity call sign of K2MST.

References

External links
 Milton J. Rubenstein Museum of Science and Technology

Science museums in New York (state)
IMAX venues
Planetaria in the United States
Museums in Syracuse, New York